Horisme vitalbata, the small waved umber, is a moth of the family Geometridae. The species was first described by Michael Denis and Ignaz Schiffermüller in 1775. It occurs in Europe.

The wingspan is 30–35 mm. The length of the forewings is 15–17 mm. The moths fly in two generations from May to June and again in August.

The larvae feed on Clematis vitalba.

Notes
The flight season refers to the British Isles. This may vary in other parts of the range.

External links

Lepiforum e.V.
De Vlinderstichting 

Melanthiini
Moths of Japan
Moths of Europe
Moths of Asia
Moths described in 1775
Taxa named by Michael Denis
Taxa named by Ignaz Schiffermüller